After the Original Style is debut album of Slovenly, released on 1984 through New Alliance Records.

Track listing

Personnel 
Slovenly
Steve Anderson – vocals, bass guitar
Rob Holtzman – drums
Lynn Johnston – violin, saxophone
Tim Plowman – keyboards, synthesizer, guitar
Tom Watson – guitar, bass guitar
Scott Ziegler – guitar, bass guitar
Production and additional personnel
Garret Griffin – guitar on "Hurry" and "Squeaky Clean"
Richard Masci – production
Peter Slovenly – production

References 

1984 debut albums
New Alliance Records albums
Slovenly (band) albums